Clarkdale Historic District in Clarkdale, Arizona is a historic district that was listed on the National Register of Historic Places in 1998.

Clarkdale was built as a company town for the United Verde Copper Company, owned by William A. Clark, which located a smelter in Clarkdale.

Historic district contributing properties include:
 Clark Mansion
 Clarkdale Public Works Building
 Clark Memorial Clubhouse, also separately NRHP-listed
 Broadway Bridge, also separately NRHP-listed

See also

References

External links

Historic districts on the National Register of Historic Places in Arizona
National Register of Historic Places in Yavapai County, Arizona
Geography of Yavapai County, Arizona
Mission Revival architecture in Arizona
Spanish Colonial Revival architecture in Arizona